The 2010–11 C.D. Motagua season in the Honduran football league was divided into two tournaments, Apertura and Clausura.  The preseason started on late June and the Regular season on 7 August 2010.

Overview
Before the start of the season, the Honduras national football team competed in the 2010 FIFA World Cup, a total of five Motagua players were call to contribute with the national team, these being Canales, Guevara, Izaguirre, Mendoza and Welcome. Nevertheless, Canales was set free from the team just after returning from the tournament.  On 19 October 2010, coach Ramón Maradiaga separated 8 players from the main squad due to poor performance and sent them to the reserve team. These players were the foreign Guillermo Díaz, Mauricio Weber, Charles Córdoba, and Marcelo dos Santos, leaving the team only with domestic players. Ronald Martínez, Meller Sánchez, Rubén Rivera, and Javier Portillo were also dismissed.  On 4 November 2010, Motagua lost 0–2 at home against C.D.S. Vida, ending any possibilities of advancing to the final round.  This game also set a record of the lowest home attendance of all times for Motagua, with only 97 spectators.

The Clausura tournament for F.C. Motagua started on 16 January 2011 with a 1–1 draw at home against C.D. Necaxa; in this game Roger Mondragón suffered a serious injury on his ankle at the 45th minute of play; it was estimated that Mondragón could be sidelined from 6 months to a year  On 7 January 2011 the International Federation of Football History & Statistics published a list of the World's Best Coach of the 1st Decade (2001–2010) and Motagua's current coach at the time, Ramón Maradiaga, appeared on the list ranked 167th.  At the end of the regular season, Motagua finished 2nd, earning the right to play on the Semifinals against C.D.S. Vida who finished 3rd. This was the first time in history that Motagua faced Vida in a semifinal series.  On 29 April 2011, the club made official its first signing for the next season; it was announced that the 24-year-old striker Luis Alfredo López signed a one-year contract.  In the semifinals, despite a 3–3 draw on aggregate against C.D.S. Vida they had the benefit of the rules and relied on its better Regular season performance. On 30 April 2011, F.C. Motagua earned a ticket to the final after defeating Vida 3–2 in Tegucigalpa, three days before they had lost 0–1 in La Ceiba.  Once in the final, the wait was over and after more than four years without domestic titles, Motagua managed to beat city rivals C.D. Olimpia 5–3 on aggregate score, thanks to a magnificent performance from Jerry Bengtson who scored three goals in the series. Also, with this achievement, Motagua qualified to the 2011–12 CONCACAF Champions League.

Players

Transfers in

Transfers out

Squad
 Statistics as of 15 May 2011
 Only league matches into account

Results
All times are local CST unless stated otherwise.

Preseason and friendlies

Apertura

Clausura

CONCACAF Champions League

After a two-year absence from international competition, F.C. Motagua participated in the 2010–11 CONCACAF Champions League as invitee; berth originally awarded to Belizean champion, however failed CONCACAF stadium requirements, so the spot vacated was awarded to Honduras (Motagua). In the preliminary round, Motagua faced Canadians Toronto FC being eliminated after a 2–3 aggregated score.

References

External links
Motagua Official Website

F.C. Motagua seasons
Motagua
Motagua